Double 99, also known as R.I.P. Productions and 10° Below, were a UK garage duo which consisted of members Timothy Andrew Liken (Tim Deluxe) and Omar Adimora. They are best known for their sole UK chart hit single "RipGroove", which reached No. 14 in its second release on the UK Singles Chart in 1997.

Career
Active since 1995, the duo recorded as R.I.P. Productions and 10° Below, releasing tracks and EPs on the Ice Cream label which they founded alongside Boogie Beat co-owner Andy Lysandrou (later of True Steppers). Under the name R.I.P., their 1997 EP Double 99 first featured the track "RipGroove" with Double 99 later adopted as their alias for the single.

Both Liken and Adimora later continued to release solo material and remained active as DJs, remixers and producers under the names Tim Deluxe and DJ Omar / Omar Chandla, respectively. Deluxe had a hit in 2002 with his second solo single, "It Just Won't Do", which reached the top 20 charts in five countries including the UK where it peaked at No. 14.

Discography

Albums
2001: 7th High (BMG/Arista)

Singles

References

External links

R.I.P. Productions discography at Discogs

English electronic music duos
Electronic dance music duos
DJ duos
Male musical duos
Speed garage musicians
UK garage duos
Arista Records artists